Moa is a municipality and an industrial city in the Holguín Province of Cuba. Its name is believed to mean "water here".

History
Moa, one of the youngest cities in Cuba, was founded in 1939. One of the most significant personalities linked to its foundation and growth was a Jamaican man, John Alexander Christie Duccas.

Geography
Located in the easternmost area of its province, at the borders with Guantánamo Province, Moa is bordered by the municipalities of Sagua de Tánamo, Frank País, Baracoa and Yateras.

The large municipal territory includes the Nipe-Sagua-Baracoa mountain range and the Alejandro de Humboldt National Park. The villages belonging to Moa municipality are Arroyo Blanco, Brinquín, Cañete, Cayo Grande, Centeno, Cocalito, Cupey, Farallones, Punta Gorda, Yaguaneque and Yamanigüey.

The city includes the quarters (repartos) of Centro, Atlántico, Caribe, José Martí, La Playa, Las Coloradas, Los Checos, Los Mangos, Miraflores and Rolo Monterrey.

Demographics
In 2010, the municipality of Moa had a population of 75,015. This city has the youngest citizens in all of Cuba, and is the second largest city (and the fourth municipality) by population in the Holguín Province.

Environment
Large nickel and cobalt deposits located in the Moa area are exploited in part by a joint venture with the Canadian company Sherritt International.

The extensive mining and nickel processing has large impact on the local environment. The coastal waters and nearby land is contaminated by the pollution from mines and processing plants. The soil has a reddish tint due to the iron ore in the ground.

Economy

Nickel production
The nickel production is concentrated on the factories "Pedro Soto Alba" and "Ernesto Che Guevara". While the Nickel Processor Plant "Pedro Soto Alba" is a limited liability company between Cuba and Sherritt International Canadian Company, the "Ernesto Che Guevara" belongs to the government enterprise Cubaníquel. As average per year, The "Soto Alba" and "Che Guevara" produce more than 30,000 tons of nickel each. This industry is what makes Moa a leading nickel producer, and what brings the town most of its GDP.

Transport
The city is served by the Orestes Acosta Airport , a regional airport with daily flights to Havana. It is crossed in the middle by the state highway "Circuito Norte" (CN), the second longest one after the "Carretera Central".

Gallery

Personalities
Addys Mercedes (b. 1973), singer

See also
List of cities in Cuba
Municipalities of Cuba

References

External links

 

 
Cities in Cuba
Populated places in Holguín Province